The 2022 Malaysian motorcycle Grand Prix (officially known as the Petronas Grand Prix of Malaysia) was the nineteenth round of the 2022 Grand Prix motorcycle racing season. It was held at the Sepang International Circuit in Sepang on 23 October 2022.

In the MotoGP class, the Ducati Lenovo Team secured the Teams' Championship, their second consecutive and third overall.

Background

Riders' entries 
In the MotoGP class, Tetsuta Nagashima continues to replace Takaaki Nakagami in the LCR Honda, given the latter's finger injury from which he has not recovered. In the Moto2 class, Zonta van den Goorbergh missed the round after suffering a broken left wrist during FP1 of the Australian race. RW Racing GP replaced him with Azroy Anuar from the Asia Road Racing Championship. Jorge Navarro also missed the round after suffering a fractured femur during the Australian race. He was replaced by Borja Gómez, riding for Flexbox HP40. Simone Corsi, from MV Agusta Forward Racing also missed the round after injuring his right little finger during the Australian race. He was replaced by David Sanchis. Winner of 4 Cub Prix Series, Kasma Daniel from Yamaha Team Asean who competed in Asia Road Racing Championship races as a wildcard for the Petronas MIE Racing RW.  Barry Baltus missed the race due to the injury. In the Moto3 class, Nicola Carraro continues in his substitution in the QJmotor Avintia Racing Team against the injured Matteo Bertelle. Syarifuddin Azman dropped wildcard for the VisionTrack Racing Team.

Free practice session

MotoGP

Combinated Free Practice 1-2-3 
The top ten riders (written in bold) qualified in Q2.

Free Practice 4

Moto2

Combinated Free Practice 1-2-3
The top fourteen riders (written in bold) qualified in Q2.

Moto3

Combined Free Practice 1-2-3

Qualifying

MotoGP

Moto2

Moto3

Warm up practice

MotoGP
Johann Zarco set the best time and was the fastest rider.

Moto2 

 Augusto Fernández finished at the top of the standings.

Moto3

The first places in the ranking are occupied by Jaume Masià.

Race

MotoGP

Moto2

 Barry Baltus was declared unfit to compete due to an ankle injury suffered in a collision with Arón Canet during FP1.

Moto3

Championship standings after the race
Below are the standings for the top five riders, constructors, and teams after the round.

MotoGP

Riders' Championship standings

Constructors' Championship standings

Teams' Championship standings

Moto2

Riders' Championship standings

Constructors' Championship standings

Teams' Championship standings

Moto3

Riders' Championship standings

Constructors' Championship standings

Teams' Championship standings

Notes

References

External links

2022 MotoGP race reports
motorcycle Grand Prix
2022
October 2022 sports events in Malaysia